James Montague Landrigan (May 31, 1923 – June 24, 1974) was an American football player who played at the tackle position.

A native of Everett, Massachusetts, he attended Wakefield High School and then played college football for Holy Cross in 1942 and at Dartmouth in 1943 as part of the V-12 Navy College Training Program. He was selected by the Pittsburgh Steelers in the 19th round (188th overall pick) of the 1945 NFL Draft but did not play for the Steelers. He later played in the All-America Football Conference (AAFC) for the Baltimore Colts during the 1947 season. He appeared in a total of five AAFC games.

Landrigan was a career officer in the United States Marine Corps. He served in World War II, the Korean War, and the Vietnam War. He served in the Pacific during World War II and was awarded the Purple Heart and Silver Star. He retired from the Navy in 1973 with the rank of colonel.

References

1923 births
1974 deaths
Baltimore Colts (1947–1950) players
Holy Cross Crusaders football players
Dartmouth Big Green football players
Players of American football from Massachusetts
Sportspeople from Everett, Massachusetts
United States Marine Corps personnel of World War II
United States Marine Corps personnel of the Korean War
United States Marine Corps personnel of the Vietnam War
United States Marine Corps colonels
Recipients of the Silver Star
Military personnel from Massachusetts